Jitpur may refer to:

Arkhaule Jitpur, Nepal
Bhawanipur Jitpur, Nepal
Jitpur Arkhaule, Nepal
Jitpur, Ilam, Nepal
Jitpur, Narayani, Nepal
Paschim Jitpur, India